List of software that implements or uses the PBKDF2 key derivation standard.

Implementations
 wolfSSL
 Libgcrypt
Bash implementation
Crypto-JS Javascript implementation
openssl's C implementation
OpenBSD's C implementation
PolarSSL's C implementation
CyaSSL's C implementation
ActionScript 3.0 implementation
.NET Framework's implementation
Delphi/Free Pascal implementation
Erlang implementation
Go implementation
PBKDF2 for Haxe
JavaScript implementations slow, less slow, fast,  benchmark
Java implementation (PBKDF2WithHmacSHA256)
Python implementation
Python standard library
Perl implementation (large), (small), (tiny), Native Perl Implementation – no dependency hell
Ruby's standard library
Ruby implementation
Rust implementation
REBOL2 implementation
PHP implementations: native (added in v5.5.0), pure PHP implementation
Scala implementation
Common Lisp implementation (Ironclad)
Web Cryptography API

Systems that use PBKDF2
GNU GRUB to protect the bootloader password
Wi-Fi Protected Access (WPA and WPA2) used to secure Wi-Fi wireless networks
Microsoft Windows Data Protection API (DPAPI)
OpenDocument encryption used in OpenOffice.org
WinZip's AES Encryption scheme.
Keeper for password hashing.
LastPass for password hashing.
1Password for password hashing.
Enpass for password hashing.
Dashlane for password hashing.
Bitwarden for password hashing.
Standard Notes for password hashing.
Apple's iOS mobile operating system, for protecting user passcodes and passwords.
Mac OS X Mountain Lion for user passwords 
 The Django web framework, as of release 1.4.
The Odoo ERP platform 
 The MODX content management framework, as of version 2.0.
 The encryption and decryption schema of Zend Framework, to generate encryption and authentication keys.
 Cisco IOS and IOS XE Type 4 password hashes
 Firefox Sync for client-side password stretching

Disk encryption software
 Filesystem encryption in the Android operating system, as of version 3.0.
FileVault (Mac OS X) from Apple Computer
FreeOTFE (Windows and Pocket PC PDAs); also supports mounting Linux (e.g. LUKS) volumes under Windows
LUKS (Linux Unified Key Setup) (Linux)
TrueCrypt (Windows, Linux, and Mac OS X)
VeraCrypt (Windows, Linux, FreeBSD, and Mac OS X)
CipherShed (Windows, Linux, and Mac OS X)
DiskCryptor (Windows)
Cryptographic disk (NetBSD)
GEOM ELI module for FreeBSD
softraid crypto for OpenBSD
EncFS (Linux, FreeBSD and Mac OS X) since v1.5.0
GRUB2 (boot loader)
Booster (Secure initramfs for Linux)
SafeGuard Enterprise (Windows and Mac OSX)
Boxcryptor Encryption Software based in EFS

References

Key derivation functions
PBKDF2 implementations